The 1899 Svenska Mästerskapet was the 4th season of Svenska Mästerskapet, the football Cup to determine the Swedish champions. Örgryte IS won the tournament by defeating Göteborgs FF in the final with a 4–0 score.

Final

References 

1899
Mas
1899 domestic association football cups